The Pakistan Army Corps of Military Police (abbreviated as MP, is the active-duty uniformed staff Corps tasked with maintaining law enforcement within the Pakistan Army. Professional misconduct and criminal investigations are conducted by the Military Police investigators and report to the Judge Advocate General Branch.

The MPs are the active members of the Pakistan Army who are professionally-trained to handle prisoners of war (POW) and to regulate the military traffic system in designated military districts, as well as to handle advanced military telecommunication equipment in their respective military districts.

History 
Formed by the Royal Military Police in 1946, it was initially a part of the Corps of Military Police (Indian Army). The Military Police was established shortly after the establishment of Pakistan, when elements of active duty Corps of Military Police reached the Abbottabad Military District (AMC) and reported to Pakistan Military Academy on November 1947 as a separate entity.  Four Military Police units were formed immediately and were retained in service. In February 1949, it was decided to expand the Military Police by establishing an Infantry School Quetta to impart training to officers, junior and non-commissioned officers, and soldiers of the Corps of Military Police. In April 1954, the Corps of Military Police's headquarters was shifted from Quetta to its present location in Dera Ismail Khan. However in 1971, the commanding office of the Military Police was relocated to the General Headquarters at Rawalpindi, Punjab Province. As for its war capabilities, the military police participated in the Indo-Pakistani wars of 1947, 1965, 1971, and 1999, and are currently undertaking operations in West Pakistan.

Beret 
The MP can be identified by their red berets, white lanyards and belts, and they also wear a white helmet (on duty performed on field) and white brassard with the letters "MP" imprinted in red. The term "red berets" is synonymous with the personnel of the elite Corps of Military Police (MP), since all ranks of this Corps are adorned with the exclusive red berets along with white belts to distinguish themselves from the other Corps of Army.

References

External links
Official website of Pakistan Army

M
M
P
Law enforcement agencies of Pakistan
M